Maulian Dana (born May 17, 1984) is the first individual to hold the position of the Penobscot Nation Tribal Ambassador. Chief Kirk Francis appointed her in September 2017.

Early life
Dana was born on the Penobscot Indian Island Reservation on May 17, 1984, and is one of five children. She is the daughter of former Penobscot Nation Chief Barry Dana, who served from 2000 to 2004. She attended the University of Maine with a focus in political science. In 2005 she was awarded the Margaret Chase Smith Public Policy Scholarship and went on to graduate in 2006.

Political career
Dana was elected to the Penobscot Nation Tribal Council in 2016 for a four-year term. In September 2017, Chief Kirk Francis appointed her as the first Tribal Ambassador of the Penobscot Nation. She is a regular fixture at the Maine State House in Augusta where she can be found testifying on behalf of her community and helping to create policy. She has proposed bills such as An Act to Ban Native American Mascots in Maine Schools and provided necessary input for the bill to change Columbus Day to Indigenous Peoples Day. Since the fall of 2018 Dana has been a board member of the Maine Center for Economic Policy, a nonpartisan research and policy organization which focuses on improving the economic well-being of low- and moderate-income Maine residents.

Activism

"Hunt for the Indian" controversy
The Skowhegan, Maine Chamber of Commerce scheduled a holiday activity entitled Hunt for the Indian in November 2017. The intention of the event was to increase visits to local businesses by offering a discounts to individuals who located small Native American figurines. Dana addressed this by both a call to action among Native Americans and allies and by addressing the issue herself head on. The choice of the Chamber's campaign was especially egregious due to the Battle of Norridgewock and the proclamation issued by Spencer Phips, both of which led to the deaths of numerous Abenaki and Penobscot Peoples. On November 5, 2017 the Chamber issued an apology stating:Never were we so wrong in thinking that this latest promotion involving the Chamber’s Skowhegan Indian statue would be a good idea. This event has been canceled. It was never our intention to offend anyone, quite the opposite. It was our goal to honor our community icon, support local business and engage the people of greater Skowhegan. No apology can take away our lack of empathy and foresight in this decision. And, for that we are truly sorry. Now we understand we’ve created a bigger problem of not seeing our actions from others’ perspectives, given the local and national issues around mascots and racism.

Dana later commended the Chamber on the cancellation of the event and their public apology.

Native American mascots

As the founder of Maine's Not Your Mascot chapter, Dana has been advocating for the eradication of Native American themed mascots, icons and names within the states educational districts.

In 2015 Dana led an effort to retire the Indians mascot in Skowhegan, Maine. On April 13, 2015, Dana was part of a panel of Wabenaki Peoples who spoke before the Skowhegan, Maine School Administrative District 54 board, residents, faculty and supporters. The school committee voted against retiring the mascot on May 7, 2015 

Dana then went on to work with other school districts in Maine and was successful in changing the Native American mascots in all remaining districts with the exception of Skowhegan. Beginning in late 2018 Dana, other Native American leaders and tribal members along with non-Native allies, began addressing the issue in Skowhegan once more. After a number of heated school board meetings as well as a district wide forum, the Skowhegan Indians mascot was retired. Shortly there after Dana introduced bill LD944, An Act To Ban Native American Mascots in All Public Schools, sponsored by Representative Benjamin Collings. On April 30, 2019 the bill passed in the Maine Senate by a vote of 23-10

Missing and murdered Indigenous women

Dana has been at the forefront of bringing attention to the missing and murdered Indigenous women epidemic that has plagued indigenous communities for years. She recently worked with Representative Ben Collings on LD 766, a bill that would permit the Penobscot and Passamaquoddy tribes to prosecute non-tribal offenders in tribal court.

Personal life
Dana continues to live on the Penobscot Indian Island Reservation with her three children.

References

1984 births
Living people
Native American activists
Native American women in politics
Penobscot people
People from Penobscot Indian Island Reservation
University of Maine alumni
20th-century Native Americans
21st-century Native Americans
20th-century Native American women
21st-century Native American women